This is a list of Spanish television related events in 1981.

Events 
 10 January: Fernando Castedo is appointed Director General of RTVE.
 23 February: Following the 1981 Spanish coup d'état attempt, the headquarters of Televisión Española in Prado del Rey are occupied by armed forces.
 24 February: TVE broadcasts a message of King Juan Carlos I, that entails the failure of the coup d’état.
 21 May: Journalist Iñaki Gabilondo is dismisses as Head of TVE News Department.
 24 October: Carlos Robles Piquer is appointed Director General of RTVE.
 5 December: Francisco wins  the Festival de la OTI, with the song Latino, representing TVE.

Debuts

Television shows

La 1

Ending this year

La 1

Foreign series debuts in Spain

Births 
 14 January - Rosa López, Cantante (participante en OT y representante de España en Eurovisión).
 17 January - Daniel Diges, actor.
 4 February - Lorena Castell, hostess.
 12 February - Ana Ibáñez, journalist.
 14 February - Gonzalo Miró, host.
 22 April -
 Bernabé Fernández, actor.
 Marta Larralde, actress.
 23 April - Uri Sabat, host
 30 April - Ana Ibáñez, journalist & hostess.
 13 May - Érika Reija, journalist.
 30 June - Àlex Casademunt, host & singer.
 6 July - Elena Ballesteros, actress.
 18 September - Aitor Luna, actor.
 29 September - Nuria Marín, hostess.
 23 October - Leticia Dolera, actress.
 5 November - Javier Pereira, actor.
 14 November - Álex García, actor
 20 November - Tamara Falcó, hostess.
 23 November - Álex Barahona, actor.
 30 November - María Castro, actress.

Deaths 
 23 January - Miguel de la Hoz, realizador, 38.
 2 July - Mercedes Prendes, actress, 73.
 1 August - Álvaro de Laiglesia, guionista, 58.
 8 September - Alfonso Sánchez, crítico de cine, 70.
 15 November - Joaquín Pamplona, actor, 57.

See also
 1981 in Spain
 List of Spanish films of 1981

References 

1981 in Spanish television